The 2003–04 Iranian Futsal Super League will be the first season of the Futsal Super League.

League standings

</noinclude><noinclude>

Top goalscorers 
36 Goals
  Mahmoud Lotfi (Shahrvand)

Awards 

 Winner: Shensa
 Runners-up: Shahid Mansouri
 Third-Place: Eram Kish
 Top scorer:  Mahmoud Lotfi (Shahrvand) (36)

References

Futsal Planet 
Futsal News 

2003-04 Super League
1